Booth Hall Children's Hospital was a children's hospital at Blackley in Manchester. It was managed by Central Manchester University Hospitals NHS Foundation Trust.

History
The hospital was founded by Humphrey Booth, who had bought the land and commissioned its building; he opened it in 1908. It cared for the poor, and from 1914 for wounded soldiers from the First World War. It reverted to being a children's hospital in 1926. It had 750 beds in 1929 and was the third largest children's hospital in the UK. It incorporated a 102-bed convalescent home. It had 160 tuberculosis beds at a home in North Wales. The infirmary was equipped to give sunlight treatment to orthopaedic cases. The hospital was emptied at the start of the Second World War and made ready for expected air-raid casualties. It joined the National Health Service in 1948.

A renal dialysis unit was opened by Princess Michael of Kent in 1980. After services transferred to the Royal Manchester Children's Hospital, Booth Hall Children's Hospital closed on 12 June 2009.

Services
It provided paediatric specialist services, general paediatric services and had a paediatric accident and emergency department, providing paediatric surgery, orthopaedic surgery, plastic surgery and a paediatric burns unit, gastroenterology, respiratory medicine and diabetology. It had a high dependency unit and a transitional care unit for long term, usually ventilated, patients.

References

Defunct hospitals in England
Hospitals in Manchester